Maria Luisa Angela Martinez de Leon-Rivera (born August 22, 1979), better known as Angelu de Leon, is a Filipino actress and politician.

Early and personal life
Angelu de Leon is the youngest daughter of Luis and Flora de Leon. She attended St. Joseph's College, Holy Spirit and Siena College. She made her first commercial, without her father's knowledge, when she was just ten years old. Her father eventually gave his blessing to her acting career before his death from colon cancer.

In 2016, De Leon disclosed that she had been diagnosed with Bell's palsy in 2009.

Acting career
De Leon started television acting at the age of 12. She was discovered by Johnny Manahan for a kiddie gag show Ang TV, aired on ABS-CBN. She shared screen time with Claudine Barretto, Jolina Magdangal and Rica Peralejo. After about a year on the said youth-oriented comedy variety-show, she signed up with Viva Films and transferred to GMA Network to do a sitcom called Ober Da Bakod with Janno Gibbs and Anjo Yllana.

De Leon also joined the movies, where she mostly played younger sister to more established stars. Among her early roles were appearances in Sharon Cuneta's Di na natuto; with Ana Roces, Vina Morales, and Donna Cruz in Kadenang Bulaklak; opposite Mikee Cojuangco in Forever, with Robin Padilla in P're Hanggang Sa Huli; and opposite Alice Dixson in Okey Si Ma'am.

In 1995, de Leon got her break when she was included in teen oriented shows like T.G.I.S. (Thank God It's Sabado) and Growing Up with Onemig Bondoc, Ciara Sotto, Raven Villanueva, Michael Flores, Rica Peralejo and Red Sternberg. These shows gave her a chance to team up with Bobby Andrews, and their partnership became one of the hottest onscreen love teams of her generation in the mid-1990s.  Among the noted Angelu-Bobby team-up movies were: Silaw, Takot Ka Ba Sa Dilim, T.G.I.S.: The Movie, Laging Naroon Ka, and Wala Na Bang Pag-ibig as well as their first drama series Ikaw Na Sana, which was also turned into a movie. In the early part of 1998 at the peak of her career, de Leon became pregnant by action star Joko Diaz. As a result, she had to go on maternity leave while the projects she had lined up got shelved or were passed on to other young stars. Despite being a young mother, she managed to come back from the career slump and accept mature roles assigned to her by Viva. She was on her way back to lead star status when she got pregnant again in 2001 by businessman Jojo Manlongat. De Leon has also shown her acting prowess in numerous movies and drama series. Among her appearances have been: Ikaw Na Sana (with Bobby Andrews and Gladys Reyes), Sana Ay Ikaw Na Nga (with Dingdong Dantes and Tanya Garcia), Ang Lahat Ng Ito'y Para Sayo (with Andrews), May Bukas Pa (with Dina Bonnevie and Cherie Gil), Abandonada (with Maricel Soriano and Edu Manzano), Aishite Imasu 1941: Mahal Kita (with Judy Ann Santos) and Paupahan (with Snooky Serna and Gloria Romero).

In part due to her status as a celebrity mom, producers hired de Leon to play parts as mothers. Her first mother role in a series was Sana ay Ikaw na Nga. In 2006, she went back to GMA's rival station ABS-CBN, where she played supporting roles including Super Inggo and its sequel Super Inggo 1.5: Ang Bagong Bangis. After the series ended, she joined the cast in the sitcom Parekoy in 2009.

Later, she returned to GMA, signing an exclusive contract via Ang Babaeng Hinugot sa Aking Tadyang (with Marian Rivera and Dingdong Dantes) (which was her comeback show in GMA 7). It was for her work in the latter soap that she was given rave reviews, complemented with the fact that she was back to her sexy figure and can give other young actresses a run for their money. After Ang Babaeng Hinugot sa Aking Tadyang, Angelu was cast in GMA's newest fantasy series called The Last Prince where she played evil aunt of Kris Bernal. She start appearing on the drama series Koreana as the kind mother of Kris Bernal, and Sisid as the ailing mother of Jackie Rice. In 2012, she joined the cast of GMA's soap opera Hindi Ka Na Mag-iisa, where she played one of the leads. De Leon is set to reprise her role as Peachy in Teen Gen. In 2013, she played Merly Lucente, the warm-hearted and fiercely protective mother in Pyra (with Thea Tolentino). Angelu is still a contract artist of GMA Artist Center.

Political career
De Leon entered into politics when she filed her candidacy for councilor in Pasig's 2nd district for the May 2022 polls under Aksyon Demokratiko. She was included in the Giting ng Pasig coalition of Mayor Vico Sotto. She garnered 138,427 votes, making her as the topnotcher councilor for Pasig's 2nd district.

Filmography

Television

Talk show

Movies

Awards and nominations

Acting awards

Other awards

Nominations

References

External links
 

1979 births
Living people
Filipino film actresses
Filipino television actresses
GMA Network personalities
Viva Artists Agency
People from Olongapo
People from Pasig
Actresses from Zambales
Aksyon Demokratiko politicians
Tagalog people
Metro Manila city and municipal councilors
Converts to evangelical Christianity
Filipino Christians
Filipino evangelicals
Filipino actor-politicians